Taylor Steele (born October 5, 1992 in Sarnia, Ontario) is a Canadian pair skater. She currently competes with Simon-Pierre Côté. She previously skated with Robert Schultz.

Programs 
(with Schultz)

Competitive highlights

With Côté

With Schultz

References

External links 

 

1992 births
Canadian female pair skaters
Living people
Sportspeople from Sarnia